The fauna of Maine include several diverse land and aquatic animal species, especially those common to the North Atlantic Ocean and deciduous forests of North America. Some of these creatures' habitats has been reduced or fully removed.

Mammals

Even-toed ungulates

Deer 
The deer of Maine include the moose, and the white-tailed deer. Caribou lived in Maine in the past.

Whales

Large baleen whales 
The large baleen whales of Maine include the blue whale, Bryde's whale, finback whale, humpback whale, minke whale, north atlantic right whale, and the sei whale

Large toothed whales 

The large toothed whales of Maine include the beluga, beaked whale, false killer whale, grampus, killer whale, northern bottlenose whale, pygmy sperm whale, short-finned pilot whale, sperm whale, and the long-finned pilot whale.

Dolphins and porpoises

Rodents 
The rodents of Maine include the North American deermouse, White-footed mouse, meadow jumping mouse, woodland jumping mouse, meadow vole, southern red-backed vole, rock vole, woodland vole, southern bog lemming, northern bog lemming, northern flying squirrel, southern flying squirrel, eastern gray squirrel, American red squirrel and the American beaver.

Lagomorphs

Rabbits 

The rabbits of Maine include the New England cottontail, and the eastern cottontail.

Hares 
The hares of Maine include the snowshoe hare.

Carnivores 

The carnivores of Maine include the red fox, gray fox, bobcat, Canadian lynx, coyote, American black bear and the extirpated gray wolf and eastern cougar.

Bats 
The bats of Maine include the eastern pipistrelle, big brown bat, little brown bat, eastern small-footed myotis, northern myotis, eastern red bat, hoary bat, and the silver-haired bat.

Other small mammals
Other small mammals of Maine include species of several different families. These include the following: hairy-tailed mole, star-nosed mole, water shrew, smoky shrew, long-tailed shrew, pygmy shrew, cinereus shrew, and the northern short-tailed shrew.

Mustelids 
The various species of weasels include: northern river otter, American mink, long-tailed weasel, ermine or short-tailed weasel, fisher (in New England is known as a fisher cat), and the American marten (Known as pine marten in some areas of New England even though the pine marten is a separate species.).

Other mammals 

Other mammals include the red squirrel, eastern gray squirrel, eastern chipmunk, woodchuck, northern raccoon, Virginia opossum, striped skunk, North American porcupine, and the common muskrat.

Birds 

Maine is a huge state with a large coastline and hundreds of lakes, streams and rivers so there are many species of waterfowl, seabirds and shore birds. A few of the most common species include the mallard, wood duck, American black duck, Canada goose, common loon, pied-billed grebe, horned grebe, red-necked grebe, northern fulmar, greater shearwater, sooty shearwater, Manx shearwater, Wilson's storm-petrel, Leach's storm-petrel, piping plover, American pipit, Arctic tern, Atlantic puffin, black tern, and the razorbill.

Maine is also home to a wide variety of birds of prey including the northern goshawk, bald eagle, sharp-shinned hawk, Cooper's hawk, northern harrier, and red-tailed hawk. great horned owl, barn owl, barred owl, long-eared owl, great gray owl and northern saw-whet owl. Maine also historically had a nesting population of golden eagles, though today it is only part of their winter range.

Other common species include the common nighthawk, whip-poor-will, chimney swift, black-capped chickadee, indigo bunting, scarlet tanager, American goldfinch, tufted titmouse and the mourning dove.

Reptiles

Snakes 
The snakes of Maine include the common garter snake, common watersnake, eastern racer, DeKay's brown snake, milk snake, redbelly snake, ribbon snake, ring-necked snake, and the smooth green snake. The timber rattlesnake previously lived in Maine, but is now extirpated.

Turtles

Land Turtles 
The land turtles of Maine include Blanding's turtle, the box turtle, common musk turtle, common snapping turtle, painted turtle, spotted turtle, and the wood turtle.

Marine Turtles 
The marine turtles of Maine include Kemp's ridley sea turtle, the leatherback sea turtle, and the loggerhead sea turtle.

Fish 
Maine's state fish is the Landlocked Atlantic Salmon.

Maine is considered the last stronghold for large lake dwelling and sea-run brook trout according to the Native Fish Coalition, these brook trout provide an important sports fishery throughout the state.

Other native sports fish species include Lake Trout, Arctic Char, Burbot, Rainbow Smelt, Lake Whitefish, White Perch and Striped Bass.

Molluscs 
There are 92 species of terrestrial gastropods in Maine.

References

External links
 Maine Department of Inland Fisheries and Wildlife

Maine
Natural history of Maine